The Bayi or August First Football Team or its full name the People's Liberation Army Bayi Football Club was a football team under the sport branch of the People's Liberation Army (PLA) that played in China's football league system between 1951 and 2003. They were predominantly based in Beijing.

The name Bayi (八一), meaning August 1st, is the founding date of the PLA. They started out as an amateur team who occasionally took part in multi-sport events until they took part in the 1951 inaugural Chinese national football league tournament. With their unprecedented monopoly of football talent taken from every army football team in the country they would establish themselves as one of the top teams within the league winning five national league titles in their history.

When the Chinese football league became a fully professional unit in the 1994 league season the club were given special dispensation to remain as semi-professional as possible by having all their members remain active military members while abstaining from foreign players and sponsorship. The cost of professionalism would see the club take on offers from cities that included Taiyuan, Xi'an, Kunming, Shijiazhuang, XinXiang, Liuzhou, Xiangtan and Hunan for financial reason. They also took sponsorship and changed their name to Bayi Zhengbang and Bayi Xiangtan, however these measures could not stop the club from relegation in 2003. With a loss in prize money and stricter regulations from the Chinese Football Association the People's Liberation Army disbanded the club.

History
The name Bayi (八一), meaning August 1st, is the founding date of the People's Liberation Army (in 1927). They started out as an amateur team who occasionally took part in the multi-sport event National Games of China. This would change when China's first fully nationalized national football league tournament started and the club was essentially re-established as a semi-professional unit to compete within the competition. While the club had a strict policy of only having active servicemen within their set-up they hired a professional coach in Dai Linjing as their Head coach in 1952 despite him being a civilian, however his professionalism saw the club go on to win the 1953 league title for the first time.

The club would incorporate existing army football teams such as the Southwest Military Region, Nanjing Army Unit and Shenyang Army Unit football team to give themselves an unprecedented monopoly of football talent throughout the country while based in Beijing. This saw them continue to be title contenders despite Dai Linjing leaving to take on the Chinese national team and the club employing from within when former player Chen Fulai took over the team in 1963. Unfortunately because of the Chinese Cultural Revolution, football in China was halted and Bayi were unable to play any competitive fixtures until 1973. When the club joined the league again in 1974 they would actually improve and go on to win the league title that season. Sustained dominance would see them go on to win the 1977, 1981 and 1986 league titles while also competing in the 1987 Asian Club Championship for the first time.

Professional era 
The club's reign as one of the most successful clubs in China would end with the advent of professionalism within the league. When the first fully professional league season started in 1994 the club were given special dispensation to remain as semi-professional as possible by having all their members remain active military members, however the club did start to take in sponsorship money to pay for the cost of running the club. Some of this money was raised by being paid to play in different cities. However, at first little changed and the team even came third within the 1996 league season. Where the club really struggled was their ability to hold on to their contingent of Chinese international players such as Hao Haidong, Hu Yunfeng and Jiang Jin who started to leave the club for better offers. Since (unlike CSKA Moscow or Partizan Belgrade FC who split from their armies and became professional clubs) it remained the representative team of the PLA, and unlike other clubs in China, Bayi were unable to sign foreign players. They therefore struggled to replace their best players and were relegated to the second tier for the first time in their history.

With less money coming in the club continued to take offers from other cities and sponsors to play for. They moved to Xinxiang and Liuzhou to accommodate their sponsors and while this worked for a brief period. The club gained promotion back into the top tier – the rebranded Chinese Super League – which required more stringent conditions for the club to work in. The loss of prize money and stricter regulations ultimately forced Bayi to disband as the PLA saw the club as an unnecessary drain on resources. The announcement in mid 2003 coincided with the loss in form of the team who were relegated and disbanded at the end of the league season.

Crest and name history

1951–1998: Bayi FC 八一足球队
1999: Bayi Jinsui 八一金穗
2000–2002: Bayi Zebon(Zhenbang) 八一振邦
2003: Bayi Xiangtan 八一湘潭

Results
All-time League Rankings

As of the end of 2003 season.

No league games in 1954–1956, 1966–1973, 1975;
 In group stage.  Only took part in half of season.  In final group stage.

Key

 Pld = Played
 W = Games won
 D = Games drawn
 L = Games lost
 F = Goals for
 A = Goals against
 Pts = Points
 Pos = Final position

 DNQ = Did not qualify
 DNE = Did not enter
 NH = Not Held
- = Does Not Exist
 R1 = Round 1
 R2 = Round 2
 R3 = Round 3
 R4 = Round 4

 F = Final
 SF = Semi-finals
 QF = Quarter-finals
 R16 = Round of 16
 Group = Group stage
 GS2 = Second Group stage
 QR1 = First Qualifying Round
 QR2 = Second Qualifying Round
 QR3 = Third Qualifying Round

Honours

Domestic
Chinese Jia-A League
Champions (5): 1953, 1974, 1977, 1981, 1986
Chinese FA Cup
Winners (1): 1990

Invitational
Queen's Cup Thailand
Winners (1): 1979

See also

Army football clubs in Communist countries
PFC CSKA Moscow
PFC CSKA Sofia
FK Partizan
FK Partizani Tirana
FC Steaua
April 25 SC

Bayi teams in other sports
 Nanchang Bayi
 Bayi Rockets
Bayi Kylin

References

External links
 Chinese military football team disbanded

People's Liberation Army
Association football clubs established in 1951
Association football clubs disestablished in 2003
Defunct football clubs in Beijing
1951 establishments in China
2003 disestablishments in China
Defunct football clubs in China
Military association football clubs in China